Elwood Alfred Towner (c. 1897 – October 6, 1954), who also adopted the title of Chief Red Cloud, was an American attorney, tribal advocate, and anti-semitic speaker.

A mixed-race Native American Hupa from Portland, Oregon, Towner was active as a speaker during the late 1930s, making speeches throughout the American Northwest, where he "defended Hitler while excoriating Jews." He was drawn to the ideals of William Dudley Pelley, specifically Pelley's stated goal of 'setting free' Native Americans from reservations and replacing them with Jews. He was also active within the American Indian Federation, and garnered support for the organization through Fascist organizations such as the German American Bund and the Silver Legion of America.

Early life and career 
Towner was born on the Siletz Reservation in the late 1890s, and attended the Chemawa Indian School in Salem as a young boy. He served in the U.S. Marine Corps during the First World War as a private, graduating from Willamette University College of Law in 1926. He advocated for native clients, calling for the closure of the Chemawa school in 1933 as a part of the "emancipation" of Indians, and opposed the federal government's dam projects on the Columbia River.

References 

1897 births
1954 deaths
Lawyers from Portland, Oregon
Native American people from Oregon
Willamette University College of Law alumni
Military personnel from Oregon
People from Lincoln County, Oregon
American fascists